Kuusamo is a town and municipality in Finland. It is located in the  Northern Ostrobothnia region.

The municipality is unilingually Finnish.

Kuusamo is a major center for winter sports and receives approximately a million tourists every year. One of the largest ski resorts in Finland, Ruka, is situated in Kuusamo. Ruka is also the host of many international competitions in ski jumping, cross-country skiing, and Nordic combined. The 2005 World Championships of Freestyle Skiing was held in Kuusamo.

History

Sami settlement
Until the 17th century, the area of Kuusamo was inhabited by the semi-nomadic Sami. During the cold season they lived in the villages Maanselkä and Kitka. In spring they moved to the rivers and in summer, after the melting of the ice, to the lakes; there they fished and gathered berries and mushrooms; in autumn they hunted reindeer, bears and beavers in the forest. Apart from fishing and hunting the Sami earned their living by trading fur with the Finns settled on the coast of the Gulf of Bothnia and the Karelians of the White Sea coast.

As a Sami settlement the area belonged to Kuusamo Kemi-Lappmark at the time. Nominally it belonged to the territory of the Swedish province of Västerbotten, but the Swedish rule was limited to the collection of taxes. At the same time Russia collected taxes in the territory it deemed state-less.

Swedish domination
From the 15th century Finnish fishermen also took advantage of the fishing grounds on the lower reaches of the river Iijoki near Kuusamo. They took regular trips of a few weeks from Kuusamo, but because the land could not provide hay for the cattle other than near the river, they founded no fixed settlements. Only when, in 1673, the Swedish government granted all settlers in Lapland a tax exemption for 15 years, did settlers from Savo and Kainuu settle in Kuusamo. They practiced slash and burn as a form of shifting cultivation. This put the Sami's hunting way of life at risk. Within a few decades the Sami population was assimilated or ousted by the Finnish settlers. By 1718 there were only two Sámi families in Kuusamo, who had already adopted the Finnish language.

The first parish in Kuusamo was founded in 1685. In 1687 a temporary chapel was built, in 1695 the first church. From the end of the 17th century the area around the lake Kuusamojärvi began to be called Kuusamo. The precise etymology of the name is unclear, however, one possible derivation is from a Sami word for "spruce forest".

The Swedish–Russian border had already been withdrawn east of Kuusamo in the 1595 Treaty of Teusina, but was long and porous. With the constant influx of new settlers, Kuusamo grew steadily in the 18th century. Agriculture, cattle and reindeer husbandry replaced nomadic cropping. Kuusamo around 1770 had about 2,000 inhabitants. In 1775 Kuusamo was removed from Lappmark and added to the newly formed province of Oulu. Because the population had increased, a new, larger church was built between 1797 and 1804. By the beginning of the 19th century the population had reached 3000 inhabitants, but a famine in 1803 and a smallpox epidemic the following year reduced the population again.

Russian domination
In 1809, Kuusamo, as with the rest of Finland, came under Russian rule. In the first half of the 19th century, the area was ravaged several times by devastating famine and epidemics. Kuusamo was spared by the catastrophic crop failure in 1867, and its population grew steadily thereafter. By 1886, 7,000 people inhabited the city; by 1894, that number grew to 8,000. With the advent of forestry at the end of the 19th century, workers moved into the area, so Kuusamo reached a population of 10,500 by 1910. In 1868, in Finland's administrative reform the parish of Kuusamo became a municipality.

Since independence

After the independence of Finland in 1917, the Russian border was closed and so Kuusamo was cut off from its hinterland. The forestry sector suffered as no wood could be rafted from Kuusamo to the ports on the White Sea. Even the reindeer economy suffered as some of the herds remained on the Russian side of the border. Therefore, between the wars agriculture developed as the most important part of the economy. By 1925 the population had risen to 14,634, but it fell by around 2000 the next year through the detachment of the villages and Posio Suolijärvi Kuusamo.

At the start of the Winter War Kuusamo was evacuated in December 1939 for fear of a Soviet invasion. In the Moscow Peace Treaty, the Winter War ended on 14 March 1940, Finland lost large parts of Karelia, the eastern areas of Salla and Kuusamo to the Soviet Union. The ceded part of Kuusamo had an area of 1653 square kilometers and included the villages Paanajärvi, Tavajärvi, Vatajärvi, Enojärvi, Pukari and Kenttikylä. Its 2100 residents were relocated to other parts of Kuusamo. During the Continuation War of 1941-1944 Kuusamo was used as a supply depot by German and Finnish troops. When it appeared that Germany might lose the war, Finland secretly negotiated a separate peace with the Soviet Union. After news of the armistice, the civilian population once again abandoned the town for fear of Russian occupation.  The Russians did briefly occupy Kuusamo and burned the village to the ground upon their departure. One of the requirements on the treaty was the removal of any and all German troops currently on Finnish soil, which escalated into a minor separate war commonly known as the Lapland War between the Finns and the Germans.

In the years between 1945 and 1952 Kuusamo was rebuilt. By the late 1960s, the population had grown to almost 21,000. As agriculture in the village could not offer enough jobs for the baby boomer generation, the population began to decline rapidly. In 1954, the first ski run on the Rukatunturi was created. Through the expansion of the Ruka ski center, Kuusamo became a tourist center. In 2000, the municipality of Kuusamo was made a town.

Geography

Kuusamo lies in the east of Finland in the Northern Ostrobothnia region on the border with Russia. The town of Kuusamo is only a small part of the municipality. The neighboring municipalities of Kuusamo are Suomussalmi in the south, Taivalkoski and Posio in the west, Salla in the north and Russia in the east.

The community center of Kuusamo, where nearly two-thirds of the population live, is only a small part of the territory. The rest of the municipality consists of sparsely populated, mostly wooded areas. Therefore, the population density of Kuusamo is only . Apart from the city, villages include Alakitka, Heikkilä, Hiltunen, Irni, Jokilampi, Kallunki, Kantokylä, Kemilä, Kero, Kesäniemi, Kiitämäjärvi, Koskenkylä, Kuolio, Kurvinen, Kärpänkylä, Käylä, Lämsänkylä, Maaselänkylä, Murtovaara, Poussu, Puutteenkylä, Rukajärvi, Määttälänvaara, Soivio, Suorajärvi, Tammela, Teeriranta, Törmäsenvaara, Vasaraperä, Virrankylä, Vuotunki, Lehto and Kiviperä.

Landscape and nature

The city lies on a roughly 250-meter-high plateau, from which the waters flow in five directions. In the area of Kuusamo there are many hills (Finn. vaara) and fells (Finn. tunturi). The highest elevations are Valtavaara (492 m), Kuntivaara (481 m), Iivaara (469 m) and Rukatunturi (490 m), the site of the Ruka ski center.

Ninety percent of the land area is forested. The forests consist mainly of pine trees (70%) with some spruce (20%) and deciduous trees (10%).   or 14% of the area of Kuusamo is covered by water. The largest of the 166 lakes in the area are Joukamojärvi, Kiitämä, Kitka, Kurkijärvi, Kuusamojärvi, Muojärvi and Suininki. Rivers in the area include Oulankajoki, Kitkajoki, Kuusinkijoki and Pistojoki flowing eastward to the White Sea and Iijoki westward to the Gulf of Bothnia.

The  area of Oulanka National Park is shared between northern Kuusamo and neighboring Salla municipality. The landscape is dominated by pine forests, Oulankajoki river and its side branches with their sandbanks and rapids, and in the northern part vast marsh areas. In the wilderness live 30 species of mammals and 120 species of birds, including brown, stone and white-tailed eagle. Wolves and lynxes are rare. Rapids in Oulankajoki include Kiutaköngäs, Taivalköngäs, Jyrävä, Niskakoski and Myllykoski.

Climate
 
The average annual temperature is −0.37 °C, annual precipitation . The warmest month is July with an average temperature of +14.3 °C, coldest January with −13.2 °C. The coldest ever measured temperature was −48 °C in Kiutaköngäs.

From 14 to 29 June Kuusamo has midnight sun.

Population

On  Kuusamo had  inhabitants. Nearly two-thirds of the population lives in the city center, called the village of Kuusamo, the rest is divided among the villages in the rural hinterland. Like most communities in the Northern and Eastern Finland, there has been marked migration to larger urban areas. The population peaked in the late 1960s at nearly 21,000 residents. With the exception of a period in the 1990s, the population has steadily declined since then.

The migration has had an effect on Kuusamo's age structure, as it is mainly young people who leave the town. For example, between 1998 and 2001, the percentage of people aged less than 15 years fell from 25% to 23%, while the share of those aged over 64 years rose from 12 to 14%.

Economy
The main economic activities in Kuusamo include forestry, reindeer husbandry, small industries and tourism. The unemployment rate, at 16.2% (2003) is relatively high.

In 2002 there were 248 farms in Kuusamo. Given the climatic conditions, milk and meat production have a major role, including reindeer meat from the approximately 10,000 semi-domesticated reindeer which roam the pastures in Kuusamo. The forestry and wood processing industry also employs over 1,000 people.

Tourism

Around one million tourists visit Kuusamo annually.  In 2002, 291,222 overnight stays were registered, 17% of which were by foreign guests. There are around 6,000 cottages (mökki) in Kuusamo, more than any other municipality in Finland.

The Ruka ski center, centered on the 492-metre Rukatunturi, is one of the largest in Finland with a total of 16,000 beds, four hotels and 28 restaurants. Activities include skiing, snowmobile tours and excursions with reindeer and dog sleds. Ruka benefits from a long snowy season, from mid-October to mid-June.

In summer, Kuusamo is a popular wilderness destination for fishing, kayaking and hiking.

Transportation
 
National highway 5 (E63) connects Kuusamo to Southern Finland. Highway 20 leads from Kuusamo to Oulu, and the main road 81 to Rovaniemi. In Suoperä at Kuusamo, there is a border crossing to Russia, opened for international traffic in 2006. In 2007, 17,000 border crossings recorded.

It was opened in 1969 and has since been expanded several times. The airline Finnair offers daily direct flights from Helsinki, adding charter flights during the tourist season. Seasonal flights are offered by Finncomm Airlines and Blue1 from Helsinki and Rossiya Airlines from St. Petersburg. In 2007, 108,394 passengers used the airport.

Culture and attractions

While Kuusamo mainly attracts visitors because of its natural beauty, the city has produced little of interest in the traditional sense. Because the city center was completely destroyed in the Lapland War and then had to be rebuilt quickly and economically, Kuusamo is seen as largely uninteresting from an architectural point of view. In contrast - at least considering the small population - the cultural life of the city is relatively lively.

The Kuusamo Hall in the town center, completed in 1996, acts as a convention and cultural center. In it one can find regular musical and theatrical performances as well as changing art exhibitions. The Kuusamo Local History Museum is an outdoor museum that has been established on a historic farm. Additionally, a school museum is set up in the old school of Kirkkoketo.

The church in the center of Kuusamo was built in 1951. It stands on the site of the old wooden church from 1802, which was burnt down in 1944 Lapland War by German troops. At that time German soldiers buried the two church bells (one endowed to the church by Charles XI of Sweden in 1698, and the other originating from the year 1721) in the cemetery to secure them from the advancing Soviet troops. The bells were considered lost until 1959, when the former German regimental commander visited Kuusamo and revealed the location of the buried bells. Today these same bells are housed in the rebuilt church.

Sports
 
Kuusamo is the venue of several international winter sports competitions. In Ruka skiing there is a stadium with the Rukatunturi-hill (HS142) and a smaller-K64 ski jumping hill and lighted trails and a biathlon facility. Since 2002, the World Cup kick-off in ski jumping and Nordic combined and cross country skiing World Cup races in Ruka Nordic Opening in late November at a joint event in Kuusamo instead. 2006's 16,000 spectators, the competition. Ruka in 2005, the Freestyle Skiing World Cup instead.

International relations

Twin towns—Sister cities
Kuusamo is twinned with:

  Hørning Municipality, Denmark  
  Avesta Municipality, Sweden  
  Askøy, Norway
  Loukhsky District, Russia

Famous people
 Alexander Kuoppala, former Children Of Bodom guitarist
 Enni Rukajärvi, slopestyle snowboarder and 2014 Winter Olympics silver medalist
 Hannu Hautala, photographer
 Tuomo Hänninen, politician
 Karoliina Honkala, Finnish chemist
 Anssi Koivuranta, ski-jumper, former Nordic combined athlete
 Pirkko Määttä, cross-country skier
 Jarkko Oikarinen, developer of IRC
 Kalevi Oikarainen, cross-country skier
 Pauli Saapunki, parliamentarian
 Ulla Parviainen, former parliamentarian, headmaster
 Kepa Salmirinne, musician
 Veikko Törmänen, visual artist
 Päivi Uitto-Riipinen, Miss Suomi 1979
 Jarkko Petosalmi, musician (Timo Rautiainen & Trio Niskalaukaus)
 Tuomas "Zuppi" Törmänen, professional Age of Empires II: Definitive Edition player playing for Team Suomi

References

External links

 Town of Kuusamo – Official website
 Ruka, ski resort in Kuusamo - Official website

 
Cities and towns in Finland
Populated places established in 1868
Ski areas and resorts in Finland
Populated lakeshore places in Finland